DCD2 Records, formerly known as Decaydance Records, is an independent record label owned by Patrick Stump and Pete Wentz of Fall Out Boy and partners, based in New York City. It was founded as an imprint of Fueled by Ramen. The first band Wentz signed to the label was Panic! at the Disco. In 2014, the label relaunched as DCD2 Records, keeping the acts that were still signed to Decaydance before the relaunch. New Politics and Lolo were the first acts signed under the new name.

Artists

Current artists 
Fall Out Boy
nothing,nowhere.
The Academy Is...
Games We Play

Former artists 
 Black Cards (Disbanded)
 The Cab (On hiatus, with Republic Records)
 Cassadee Pope (Active with Awake Music)
 Charley Marley (Active without a record label)
 Cobra Starship (Disbanded)
 Cute Is What We Aim For (Unsigned)
 Destroy Rebuild Until God Shows (Active, Velocity Records)
 Doug
 Gym Class Heroes (On hiatus)
 Four Year Strong (Active with Pure Noise Records)
 Hey Monday (Disbanded)
 The Hush Sound (Active without a record label)
 Lifetime (Active with No Idea Records)
L.I.F.T (Indefinite hiatus)
 LOLO (Active with Crush/Atlantic Records)
MAX (Active with RED Music)
 Millionaires (On indefinite hiatus)
 New Politics (Active with RCA records)
 October Fall (Disbanded)
 Panic! at the Disco (Disbanded)
Travie McCoy (Active with Hopeless Records)
 Tyga (Active with Last Kings/EMPIRE)
 The Ready Set (Active with Hopeless Records)

Discography

See also 
 List of record labels
 Fueled by Ramen

References

External links 
 

American independent record labels
Record labels established in 2005
Alternative rock record labels
2005 establishments in the United States